Daniil Vladimirovich Krutskikh (born 24 June 2000) is a Russian sailor.

Krutskikh became the first Russian winning gold at the Laser Radial World Championships, doing so in 2020.

References

External links
 

2000 births
Living people
Russian male sailors (sport)
Sportspeople from Saint Petersburg